Alexander Roberts (born 1 October 1939) is a New Zealand cricketer. He played in seven first-class matches for Wellington from 1959 to 1964.

See also
 List of Wellington representative cricketers

References

External links
 

1939 births
Living people
New Zealand cricketers
Wellington cricketers
Cricketers from Napier, New Zealand